"You're So Good to Me" is a song written by Brian Wilson and Mike Love for the American rock band the Beach Boys, released on July 5, 1965, on the album Summer Days (And Summer Nights!!). It was later included as the B-side of the group's single "Sloop John B", which was released on March 21, 1966. Mojo later wrote that the song was the closest the group had come to northern soul.

Background and recording
Brian Wilson wrote "You're So Good to Me" while in Hawaii. He commented on the song, "The ones that aren't the hardest, right, they're the best… 'You're So Good to Me' was written in 20 minutes. I knew it was special. The songs that come the fastest are the ones I like the most."

The basic track for "You're So Good to Me" was recorded at Western Studios in early May 1965. Take 24 was used as the master. On May 24, the lead and backing vocals for the song were recorded at Columbia Studios. Wilson wrote in 1990 that the track was "spearheaded by a guitar sent through a Leslie speaker. It gave it an eerie effect."

Wilson dubbed it a "tongue song" for its repeated "la, la, la" backing vocals in the chorus.

Personnel

According to band researcher Craig Slowinski:

The Beach Boys
Brian Wilsonlead and backing vocals, piano, handclaps
Al Jardinebacking vocals, electric rhythm guitar, bass guitar
Bruce Johnstonbacking vocals, Hammond organ
Mike Lovebacking vocals
Carl Wilsonbacking vocals, electric lead and rhythm guitars
Dennis Wilsondrums

Additional musicians
Ron Swallowtambourine
Marilyn Wilsonpossible backing vocals

Alternate versions
In 2007, the compilation The Warmth of the Sun released the first stereo remix of "You're So Good to Me". Previously, the song was only available in monophonic and duophonic capacities.

Cover versions

1965 - Debra Swisher, single
1966 - The Factotums, single
1968 - The Kit Kats, single
1976 – Design, single
1976 – The Langley Schools Music Project, Lochiel, Glenwood, and South Carvolth Schools
1994 – Velocity Girl, "Your Silent Face" B-side
2001 – Wilson Phillips, An All-Star Tribute to Brian Wilson
2005 – Math and Physics Club, Movie Ending Romance
2016 – M. Ward, More Rain

References

The Beach Boys songs
1965 singles
American soul songs
Songs written by Brian Wilson
Songs written by Mike Love
Capitol Records singles
1965 songs
Song recordings produced by Brian Wilson